Brown Owl is a synonym for the tawny owl. It may also refer to:
 a title often given to the adult pack leader in Girlguiding UK
 Brown Owl, New Zealand, a suburb of Upper Hutt, New Zealand